"The End" is the second single from the album 7 Years and 50 Days by German trance group Groove Coverage.

Remix List

"The End" (Radio Edit) – 3:42
"The End" – 3:08
"The End" (Extended Mix) – 8:11
"The End" (Special D Remix) – 6:57
"The End" (Axel Konrad Remix) – 7:35
"The End" (Brooklyn Bounce Remix) – 6:03

Chart positions

References

Groove Coverage songs
2003 singles
2003 songs
Songs written by Lou Bega